Ge with descender (Ӷ ӷ; italics: Ӷ ӷ) is a letter of the Cyrillic script formed from the Cyrillic letter Ge (Г г Г г) by adding a descender. In Unicode this letter is called "Ghe with descender".

Ge with descender is used in the alphabets of the following languages (for details consult the articles on the languages):

Computing codes

See also
Г г : Cyrillic letter Ge
Ҕ ҕ : Cyrillic letter Ge with middle hook

References

Cyrillic letters with diacritics
Letters with descender (diacritic)